Nolan Clark (born 18 March 1984) is a South African rugby union player whose usual playing position is lock.

He was released by the Cavaliers after two seasons at the Wellington-based outfit.

References

South African rugby union players
Living people
1984 births
Sharks (Currie Cup) players
Griquas (rugby union) players
Boland Cavaliers players
Eastern Province Elephants players
Rugby union locks